Turquoise Coast is a name attributed to a section of the coastline of Western Australia in the vicinity of Jurien Bay.

It lies south of Batavia Coast and north of the Sunset Coast.

Islands in the reserve include Beagle Islands, Cervantes Islands, Escape Island, Edwards Island, Lancelin Island, Wedge Island, Whitlock Island and Favorite Island.

Notes

 
Coastline of Western Australia
Nature reserves in Western Australia
Mid West (Western Australia)